Scott Houston (born 11 June 1990) is an American track and field athlete who competes in the pole vault. He was the American national indoor champion in 2018. He competed collegiately for both the North Carolina Tar Heels and the Indiana Hoosiers. Houston has also coached collegiate pole vaulters.

Career
Born in Winter Springs, Florida, he moved with his family to Oak Ridge, North Carolina and attended nearby Northwest Guilford High School. He competed in pole vault while there and broke the state high school record and was captain of the school track and field team. Houston went on to study a sports science major at University of North Carolina at Chapel Hill and competed for their North Carolina Tar Heels collegiate track team. He redshirted the 2010 indoor and the 2011 outdoor seasons.

He continued his studies at Indiana University Bloomington and with their Indiana Hoosiers he won the 2013 Big Ten Conference outdoor title and was a qualify for the NCAA Outdoor Championships. A mature student, he also served as a volunteer assistant track coach from 2013 to 2015. He helped coached fellow vaulter Terry Batemon to a conference title and Kelsie Ahbe and Sophie Gutermuth to a 1–2 placing at the 2014 Big Ten Championships. He was named track and field assistant coach at High Point University in 2015.

Houston's own progress stalled from 2009 to 2014, given his focus on academics and coaching. In the outdoor season another best of  followed, but he failed to record a height at the 2015 USA Outdoor Track and Field Championships. He cleared  in the 2016 outdoor season, but failed to figure among the leaders at the 2016 United States Olympic Trials due to an ankle injury that took place en route to qualifying for the Olympic Trials Final. He managed fourth at the 2017 USA Indoors, then was fifth at the 2017 USA Outdoor Track and Field Championships. A new best of  that July ranked him in the world top 25 vaulters for the first time.

Competition record

National titles
USA Indoor Track and Field Championships
Pole vault: 2018

References

External links

Living people
1990 births
Track and field athletes from Florida
Track and field athletes from North Carolina
American male pole vaulters
American track and field coaches
Indiana Hoosiers track and field coaches
Indiana Hoosiers men's track and field athletes
North Carolina Tar Heels men's track and field athletes
High Point Panthers track and field coaches
USA Indoor Track and Field Championships winners